The Southfield Public Library is a public library in Southfield, Michigan. The library serves the communities of Southfield and Lathrup Village.

History 
Library services began for the people living in the Township of Southfield in 1844. The services proved so popular that by 1845, Township rules were adopted for the Southfield Township Library.  The early Library system relied heavily on  school districts. Every three months, the Township librarian took a rotating collection of books to each school.

In the 1950s, a group of citizens began a campaign for a public library in the newly formed City of Southfield.  This group eventually became known as the Friends of the Southfield Public Library.  Their efforts were successful, and on February 3, 1960 the first Southfield Public Library opened its doors in a renovated two-room school house.

It quickly became apparent that the Library would need a new building in order to keep up with the rapid growth and vitality of the new City of Southfield.   In 1964, the Library moved to a new building in the Southfield Civic Center complex.  The 1960s and 1970s were years of continued growth for the City of Southfield and its Library.  To keep pace with the City's expansion, an enlarged and renovated Southfield Public Library was made available to the community in 1980.

In 1999, Southfield voters approved a millage increase to build and operate a new library building. The new Southfield Public Library opened on June 15, 2003.

On May 3, 2011 Southfield voters approved a millage for police and fire protection, library operations, street maintenance and parks and recreation programming.  The millage was passed with over 83% of the vote.

On September 4, 2012, the library began shortened hours due to property tax revenue decreases.

Services & collections 

Southfield Public Library provides a book collection of over 250,000 volumes and subscribes to numerous print magazines and newspapers.  Large print titles as well as video magnifiers and computer enhancements are available for individuals with limited vision.

A Small Business StartUp Center provides resources for small businesses and non-profits.

The Southfield Public Library also offers a collection of audio books, DVDs, videocassettes, music CDs, electronic books, and downloadable audio books for users.

The Library offers over 120 public computers in addition to wireless access throughout the building.  Public computers offer free access to the Library catalog, research sources and the Internet. Hands-on computer classes in two computer labs give participants assistance with the basics of the Internet, email and popular software.

The Southfield Public Library hosts numerous educational and informational programs and exhibits.  Regular programs are story times, Battle of the Books, Jazz & Blues @ Your Library, Humanities group, book discussions and more special programs.  The library also has four different exhibit areas with rotating exhibits.

Art collection 

The Library is home to numerous artworks. Many were relocated from the city's former Northland Center shopping mall following its closure in 2015.

 Mark Twain Bench by Gary Lee Price Studios
 Boy and Bear, bronze sculpture by Marshall Fredericks
 Two Bears, bronze sculpture by Marshall Fredericks
 Martin Luther King Jr. bust by James Spearman
 Journeys of the Imagination by Gary Lee Price Studios
 Seasons of the Imagination, tiles by Laurie Eisenhardt
 Birdhouses from Maine by Naturally Wood
 Book sculpture and Butterfly Bench
 Wind Blowing by Jerry Pinkney
 Sophie and Rose by Wendy Anderson Halperin
 Bedtime Stories by Jane Dyer
 Brown Honey in Broomwheat Tea by Floyd Cooper
 The Voyage Begins by Anthony Bacon Venti
 Dave the Potter by Bryan Collier

 Cat in the Hat by David McKnight, Emerald City Designs
 Dr. Seuss sculptures: The Tufted Gustard, Two Horned Drouberhannis, Andulovian Grackler, Blue-Green Abelard, Seuss Sawfish, Mulberry Street Unicorn, Semi-Normal Green Lidded Fawn, Flaming Herring, Carbonic Walrus, Gimlet Fish, Sea Going Dilemma Fish, Powerless Puffer and Sludge Tarpon
 Dr. Seuss prints: Singing Cats; Oh, the Places You’ll Go; Fox in Socks; A Plethora of Fish; Oh, The Stuff You Will Learn
 Book Quilt by the staff of the Southfield Public Library
 Twist Sculpture by Rollin Karg Glass Studio
 Les Fleurs de Babylone Art Quilt by Joy Saville
 Transformation Art Glass by Janet Kelman
 Still Water Reflections Fiber Wall Piece by Tim Harding

References

External links 
Reading Into the Future by Eva Gronowska at newsweek.com - 
2004 Building Team Project of the Year Awards by Building Design and Construction 
Southfield Public Library's vision, mission and value statements - 
 Southfield Public Library website

Library buildings completed in 1964
Public libraries in Michigan
Education in Oakland County, Michigan
Southfield, Michigan
Buildings and structures in Oakland County, Michigan